John Melling (born 16 December 1970) is a male British former wrestler.

Wrestling career
Melling represented England and won a silver medal in the 62 kg featherweight category, at the 1994 Commonwealth Games in Victoria, British Columbia, Canada. Eight years later he also competed in the 2002 Commonwealth Games in Manchester.

In 1990, he moved to Vancouver , Canada and attended Simon Fraser University.  He wrestled for the varsity team winning the NAIA Championships at 134 Ibs in 1992 and 1993, he was second at 142Ibs in 1995, before winning the 142Ib weight division in his final year in 1996.  He was inducted into the NAIA Hall of Fame.

References

1971 births
Living people
British male sport wrestlers
Commonwealth Games medallists in wrestling
Commonwealth Games silver medallists for England
Wrestlers at the 1994 Commonwealth Games
Wrestlers at the 2002 Commonwealth Games
Medallists at the 1994 Commonwealth Games